This is a list of the moths of family Cossidae which are found in Chile. It also acts as an index to the species articles and forms part of the full List of moths of Chile. Subfamilies are listed alphabetically.

Subfamily Chilecomadiinae
Chilecomadia moorei (Silva, 1915)
Chilecomadia valdiviana (Philippi, 1859)
Rhizocossus munroei Clench, 1957

Subfamily Hypoptinae
Breyeriana ambigua (Hubner, 1818)
Breyeriana cistransandina Orfila, 1957
Givira albosignata Ureta, 1957
Givira australis Ureta, 1957
Givira brunneoguttata Gentili, 1989
Givira leonera Clench, 1957
Givira vicunensis Ureta, 1957
Hypopta albescens (Ureta, 1957)
Hypopta brunneomaculata Dyar, 1828
Hypopta chiclin Dognin, 1905
Philanglaus breyeri (Ureta, 1957)
Philanglaus serenensis (Ureta, 1957)
Philanglaus monsalvei (Ureta, 1957)
Philanglaus ornatus Butler, 1882
Philanglaus terranea (Ureta, 1957)
Philiodoron cinereum Clench, 1957
Philiodoron frater Clench, 1957

External links

Macrolepidópteros Heteróceros de Chile y de sus áreas adyacentes

.C
Chile
Moths, Cossidae